Three Anglo-Saxon metrical charms "Against a dwarf" are contained within in the Lacnunga, which seek to heal an afflicted person by ridding them of a dwarf.

Charms

Remedies LXXXVIIc and LXXXVIIIc
The remedies LXXXVIIc and LXXXVIIIc consist of writing Christian symbols, such as crosses and both Latin and Greek letters, along the arms of the sick person. This is then followed by mixing grated celandine with ale and invoking the names of saints, including the Welsh Saint Macutus.

Remedy XCIIIb
Remedy XCIIIb is the most detailed of the  charms, consisting of writing the names of the Seven Sleepers of Ephesus on Communion wafers before reciting a :

It has been noted that several components of this charm suggest that it was old at the time of its recording, such as the use of the word "", which would have had no clear meaning at the time of writing, and a lack of an alliterating vowel where expected in line 5 of the galdor.

Interpretation and discussion
It has been argued that the  charms form part of a wider North Sea Germanic tradition that links dwarfs to the onset of sickness, also attested in the 8th century CE Ribe skull fragment and a lead plaque found near Fakenham in Norfolk dating to the 8th-11th century CE. In this cultural context, it has been argued that attempting to discriminate between the dwarf and the disease it is causing is not necessarily helpful, given that the banishing or killing of the harmful dwarf also is believed to lead to recovery from the sickness.  

It has been proposed that the sickness in question is related to sleeping because of the inclusion of the Seven Sleepers in the charm. According to one source, "The names of the Seven Sleepers of Ephesus occur in various charms of the Middle Ages. They are usually, as might be expected, to secure sleep, but in some cases are to be employed against fever".

The conception of the dwarf in remedy XCIIIb has been proposed to link to the concept of a mare, a harmful being in Germanic folklore that is the root of the word "nightmare" and has been equated with the phenomenon of sleep paralysis. According to this theory, the dwarf in this charm is a manifestation of a night monster, as dwarfs were linked to the idea of harmful spirits and thought to be capable of causing physical harm. Similarity between the dwarf in XCIIIb and mares in medieval and later Germanic folklore is further seen in the conception of both beings riding their victims, causing symptoms such as injury, hallucinations and fevers.

See also
 Apotropaic magic
 Canterbury charm
 Kvinneby amulet
 Sigtuna amulet I

References

Bibliography

Secondary
 
 
 
 
 

Sleep in mythology and folklore
Anglo-Saxon metrical charms